South East England was a constituency of the European Parliament. It elected 10 Members of the European Parliament (MEPs) using the D'Hondt method of party-list proportional representation until the UK exit from the European Union on 31 January 2020.

Boundaries 
The constituency corresponded to South East England, in the south east of the United Kingdom, comprising the ceremonial counties of Berkshire, Buckinghamshire, East Sussex, Hampshire, the Isle of Wight, Kent, Oxfordshire, Surrey and West Sussex.

History 
It was formed as a result of the European Parliamentary Elections Act 1999, replacing a number of single-member constituencies.  These were Buckinghamshire and Oxfordshire East, East Sussex and Kent South, Hampshire North and Oxford, Itchen, Test and Avon, Kent East, Kent West, South Downs West, Surrey, Sussex South and Crawley, Thames Valley, Wight and Hampshire South, and parts of Bedfordshire and Milton Keynes, Cotswolds, and London South and Surrey East.

Returned members

Election results 

Elected candidates are shown in bold.  Brackets indicate the order candidates were elected and the number of votes per seat won in their respective columns.

References

European Parliament constituencies in England (1999–2020)
Politics of South East England
1999 establishments in England
Constituencies established in 1999
Constituencies disestablished in 2020